The Vardinogiannis Foundation is a Greek charity that was created in 1980 and is run by the Vardinogiannis family.

Although its activities are numerous, the family prefers to keep a "low profile" on its charitable actions  and therefore most of them remain unknown to the public.

Some of its activities include the financial support of The Smile of the Child, the "Panagia Kalyviani" convent in the Heraklio Prefecture, as well as the creation and running expenses of Elpida (Hope) hospital.

Since 1989, the Vardinogiannis Foundation also grants scholarships for undergraduate and post-graduate studies in Greece to candidates who originate and are studying exclusively in Greek educational institutions.

See also
 Giannis Vardinogiannis
 Marianna Vardinoyannis
 Vardis Vardinogiannis
 Yiorgos Vardinogiannis

References

1980 establishments in Greece
Foundations based in Greece